The R4 is a line of Rodalies de Catalunya's Barcelona commuter rail service, operated by Renfe Operadora. It runs northwards from the northern limits of the province of Tarragona to Barcelona, passing through the inland Alt Penedès region. The line then continues towards central Catalonia, describing a U-shaped route through the Barcelona area.

Together with lines R1,  and R3, the R4 (then simply numbered line 4) started services in 1989 as one of the first lines of the Cercanías commuter rail system for Barcelona, known as Rodalies Barcelona. In 1995, the branch line to Cerdanyola Universitat railway station opened for passenger service and was incorporated as part of line R4. With the creation of Barcelona commuter rail service line  in 2005, the branch line was transferred to the R7. In the long-term future, it is projected that the route of the R4 south of Barcelona will be transferred to the R2, and all its services will terminate at Barcelona–El Prat Airport.

List of stations
The following table lists the name of each station served by line R4 in order from south to north; the station's service pattern offered by R4 trains; the transfers to other Rodalies de Catalunya lines, including both commuter and regional rail services; remarkable transfers to other transport systems; the municipality in which each station is located; and the fare zone each station belongs to according to the Autoritat del Transport Metropolità (ATM Àrea de Barcelona) fare-integrated public transport system and Rodalies de Catalunya's own fare zone system for Barcelona commuter rail service lines.

2018 and 2019 derailments
On 20 November 2018, a train on this line derailed due to a landslide between the Vacarisses and Vacarisses Torreblanca stations, causing one death and 49 injuries. Another derailment occurred on 8 February 2019 between Sant Vicenç de Castellet and Manresa, killing the driver and injuring several other people.

References

Bibliography

External links
 Rodalies de Catalunya official website
 Schedule for the R4 (PDF format)
 R4 Rodalies (rod4cat) on Twitter. Official Twitter account by Rodalies de Catalunya for the R4 with service status updates (tweets usually published only in Catalan)
 
 R4 (rodalia 4) on Twitter. Unofficial Twitter account by Rodalia.info monitoring real-time information about the R4 by its users.
 Information about the R4 at trenscat.cat 

4
Railway services introduced in 1989